The boxing events of the 1975 Mediterranean Games were held in Algiers, Algeria.

Medalists

Medal table

References
1975 Mediterranean Games report at the International Committee of Mediterranean Games (CIJM) website
1975 Mediterranean Games boxing tournament at Amateur Boxing Results

Medi
Sports at the 1975 Mediterranean Games
1975